Roger Lawson Gamble (1787 – December 20, 1847) was a United States representative and lawyer from Georgia.

Born near Louisville, in 1787, Gamble studied law, was admitted to the state bar in 1815 and began practicing law in Louisville. He was an officer in the War of 1812. Gamble served in the Georgia House of Representatives in 1814 and 1815.

Gamble was elected in 1832 as a Jacksonian to the 23rd United States Congress and served one term from March 4, 1833, until March 3, 1835, as he unsuccessfully ran for reelection in 1834. He was elected to the U.S. House again as a Whig to represent Georgia in the 27th U.S. Congress and served one term from March 4, 1841, until March 3, 1843, as his lost his reelection bid for a second term in that seat in 1842. From 1845 to 1847, Gamble served as a judge of the superior court of Georgia. He died in Augusta, Georgia, on December 20, 1847, and was buried in Old Capitol Cemetery in Louisville.

References

External links

1787 births
1847 deaths
People from Louisville, Georgia
Georgia (U.S. state) lawyers
Georgia (U.S. state) state court judges
Members of the Georgia House of Representatives
American military personnel of the War of 1812
Jacksonian members of the United States House of Representatives from Georgia (U.S. state)
Whig Party members of the United States House of Representatives from Georgia (U.S. state)
American slave owners
19th-century American politicians